The Disappearance is an eight-part French police thriller mini-series, which was originally broadcast in France from 22 April to 13 May 2015, and inspired by the Spanish series Desaparecida. The series was subsequently broadcast in the United Kingdom, in a subtitled version, beginning 28 May 2016, on BBC4.

The series explores the complex drama caused by the disappearance of a teenage girl in Lyon, and the subsequent police investigation to find her.

Cast and credits

References

External links 
 

French police procedural television series
2015 French television series debuts
2015 French television series endings
2010s French television miniseries
Television series about missing people